Expired may refer to:
 Expired (2007 film), a comedy-drama film
 Expired (2022 film), an Australian independent science fiction film

See also
 Expiration (disambiguation)
 Expired air